Soslan Ruslanovich Takulov (born 28 April 1995) is a Russian football player who plays for Atyrau.

Club career
He made his debut in the Russian Professional Football League for FC Dynamo Stavropol on 20 July 2017 in a game against FC Angusht Nazran.

References

External links
 Profile by Russian Professional Football League
 
 

1995 births
Living people
Sportspeople from Vladikavkaz
Russian footballers
Russian expatriate footballers
Expatriate footballers in Georgia (country)
Expatriate footballers in Belarus
Expatriate footballers in Kazakhstan
Association football defenders
FC Sevastopol (Russia) players
FC Dynamo Stavropol players
FC Okean Kerch players
FC Saturn Ramenskoye players
FC Metalurgi Rustavi players
FC Slutsk players
FC Shakhter Karagandy players
FC Akzhayik players
FC Atyrau players
Erovnuli Liga players
Belarusian Premier League players